Ludwig I (before 31 October 1412 – 23/24(?) September 1450, in Urach), Count of Württemberg. He was a son of count Eberhard IV and Henriette of Montbéliard. He reigned from 1419 until 1450.

After the death of his father count Eberhard IV, he and his brother Ulrich V were put under the tutelage from 1419 to 1426. Besides his mother Henriette of Montbéliard this guardianship was executed by officials, the so-called Regentschaftsrat (Regency Council).

After his coming of age, Ludwig reigned in Württemberg since 1426. He first reigned alone and later, starting in 1433, together with his brother Ulrich V. Ludwig was married to Mechthild of the Palatinate. The wedding was celebrated on 21 October 1436 in Stuttgart. After Ulrich's wedding with Margarethe von Cleve, the two brothers agreed on the partition of Württemberg. This was first limited to four years, but  was made permanent by the Treaty of Nürtingen, signed on 23 January 1442.

Ludwig received the part of Urach with the territories in the south and the west of the county, including the territories in Alsace.
After the death of Henriette of Montbéliard in 1444, Ludwig also obtained Montbéliard. Ludwig remodeled Urach into his residence and implemented an active policy to strengthen the monasteries in his realm of power.

He tried to align Württemberg more with the Wittelsbach and Habsburg dynasties. For example he supported duke Albert VI of Austria in his fight against the Old Swiss Confederacy.

He died in 1450 as a result of the plague.

Children
Ludwig I and Mechthild of the Palatinate had the following children:
Mechthild (aft 1436 – 6 June 1495), married since 1454 with Louis II, Landgrave of Hesse (1438–1471)
Ludwig II (3 April 1439 – 3 November 1457), since 1450 Count of Württemberg-Urach
Andreas (* 11.4 und † 19.5.1443)
Eberhard V (11 December 1445 – 24 February 1496), since 1457 count of Württemberg-Urach, since 1495 Duke Eberhard I. of Württemberg
Elisabeth (4 October 1447 – 3 June 1505), married since 1470 with Johann II of Nassau-Saarbrücken in Saarbrücken (1423–1472), and since 1474 with Heinrich dem Älteren, Count zu Stolberg (1436–1511)

Ancestors

See also
History of Württemberg

References

15th-century births
1450 deaths
15th-century counts of Württemberg
15th-century deaths from plague (disease)
Medieval child monarchs